Clara Milburn born Clara Emily Bagnall (24 June 1883 – 29 May 1961) was a British housewife in Coventry whose diary gives an insight into domestic life during the Second World War.

Life 
Milburn was born in Coventry in 1883. Her parents were Harriett (born Gibson) and her husband Frank Bagnall who was an iron turner. She had a brother named Frank who was in the engineering trade. Clara married "Jack" (John) Milburn in 1905 and they led a middle class life with a lifelong maid and two cars. She was a member of her local church and the Women's Institute and a supporter of her city's 14th century cathedral. She and "Jack" had one child, Alan John Milburn, who was born in 1914.

Her brother and her husband worked at Alfred Herbert Ltd, who manufactured machine tools in Coventry. His wages paid for their cars and she was particularly keen on driving them for pleasure.

The year 1940 was an eventful year. Her only son was in the Territorial Army and in January we was sent overseas; the following month she started the diary that would record her family and Coventry's experience of the Second World War. June 1940 saw her recording that Alan was missing and it was not until the middle of July that she found out that he was not dead but a prisoner of war. That year they were sheltering from German bombers who were conducting nighttime raids over Britain. The terrible raid of the night of 14 November saw them confined to their shelter for ten hours. When they emerged the "heart had been knocked out" of Coventry. She heard that her son had a leg wound, but it was not until January 1941 that she had a letter from him confirming that he was a prisoner, but his leg was better. He did not return to Coventry until 10 May 1945.

Milburn died in Royal Leamington Spa in 1961.

Legacy
The fifteen volumes of Milburn's diary were read by Christopher Morgan who was a friend of the Milburn family. He was intrigued and he championed them with publishers. Fontana decided to publish them after they had been edited by Peter Donnelly. They were published in 1979 and they cover the years of the Second World War.

Her diary features in a book by Virginia Nicholson about women's experiences in Coventry during the Second World War.

References 

1883 births
1961 deaths
People from Coventry
British diarists